Eutetramorus is a genus of algae belonging to the family Radiococcaceae.

Species:

Eutetramorus fottii 
Eutetramorus globosus 
Eutetramorus granuliferus 
Eutetramorus mollenhaueri 
Eutetramorus nygaardii 
Eutetramorus planctonicus 
Eutetramorus polycoccus 
Eutetramorus tapasteanus 
Eutetramorus tetrasporus

References

Sphaeropleales
Sphaeropleales genera